Samana is a genus of moths in the family Geometridae erected by Francis Walker in 1863.

Species
Samana acutata Butler, 1877
Samana falcatella Walker, 1863

References

Oenochrominae